Vincent Braillard (born 29 April 1985) is a Swiss motorcycle racer.

After his racing career, he started a new career as a floorball player. He currently plays for Unihockey Team Semsales.

Career statistics

Grand Prix motorcycle racing

By season

Races by year
(key)

References

External links
Profile on MotoGP.com

Swiss motorcycle racers
1985 births
Living people
125cc World Championship riders
Sportspeople from the canton of Fribourg